Munkhammar may refer to:

Lilla Munkhammar, an urban locality in Eskilstuna Municipality, Södermanland County, Sweden :sv:Lilla Munkhammar
Herbert Munkhammar, also known as Afasi (born 1985), Swedish hip hop artist, rapper and singer and part of various formations like Afasi & Filthy, Maskinen and Ansiktet
Johnny Munkhammar (1974–2012), Swedish political writer and blogger